Crescent Towers are towers just east of Crescent Spire and south of Eastpost Spire in the Purcell Mountains of the Columbia Mountains in southeastern British Columbia, Canada. Crescent towers consist of the North tower, two Central towers, and the two southernmost towers named "Donkey Ears" because they resemble the ears of the animal.

Routes

North Tower 
 North Ridge, 5.6
 Northwest Side, 5.4

Central Towers 
 Northwest Gully, 4th
 Lion's Way, 5.6
 Lions and Tigers, 5.8
 Tiger's Trail, 5.9
 Lost in Space, 5.10+

South Towers (Donkey's Ears) 
 Thatcher Cater, 5.10
 Edwards-Neufeld, 5.10+
 Ears Between, 5.7
 Eeyore, 5.9

References

Mountains of British Columbia
Columbia Valley
Purcell Mountains